= Jamage =

Village in Maharashtra

- Village
- Interactive map of Jamage
- Country: India
- State: Maharashtra

Jamage is a small village in Ratnagiri district, Maharashtra state in Western India. The 2011 Census of India recorded a total of 1,151 residents in the village. Jamage's geographical area is 529 hectares (1,310 acres).
